Erkki Tuominen (1914–1975) was a Finnish politician. He was a member of the Communist Party and served as the minister of justice briefly between 1970 and 1971.

Biography
Tuominen was born in 1914. He was a member of the Communist Party. Shortly after World War II he served in the state police. He was elected as a member of the political bureau of the Communist Party's central committee in April 1963. Tuominen was the minister of justice between 1970 and 1971 in the cabinet led by Ahti Karjalainen. Tuominen died in 1975.

References

20th-century Finnish politicians
1914 births
1975 deaths
Communist Party of Finland politicians
Ministers of Justice of Finland